Gold is a compilation album by The Moody Blues, released in 2005 by Polydor Records as part of Polydor's Gold series.

Track listing 
All songs were written by Justin Hayward and performed by the Moody Blues, except where noted.

Personnel

Disc 01
Justin Hayward – guitar, vocals
John Lodge – bass, guitar, vocals
Michael Pinder – keyboards, vocals
Ray Thomas – vocals, flute, percussion, harmonica
Graeme Edge – drums, percussion, vocals

Disc 02
Track 01:
Blue Jays
Justin Hayward – guitar, vocals
John Lodge – bass, vocals
Kirk Duncan – piano
Jim Cockey – violin
Tom Tompkins – viola
Tim Tompkins – cello
Graham Deakin – drums
Track 02:
Blue Jays with 10cc
Justin Hayward – guitar, lead vocals
Lol Creme – guitar, vocals
Kevin Godley – drums, vocals
Graham Gouldman – bass, vocals
Eric Stewart – keyboards, vocals
Tracks 03-05:
Justin Hayward – guitar, vocals
John Lodge – bass, guitar, vocals
Michael Pinder – keyboards, vocals
Ray Thomas – vocals, flute, percussion, harmonica
Graeme Edge – drums, percussion, vocals
Track 06:
See above
Tracks 07-13:
Justin Hayward – guitar, vocals
John Lodge – bass, guitar, vocals
Ray Thomas – vocals, flute, percussion, harmonica
Graeme Edge – drums, percussion, vocals
Patrick Moraz – keyboards
Tracks 14-16:
Justin Hayward – guitar, vocals
John Lodge – guitar, vocals
Ray Thomas – vocals, flute, percussion
Graeme Edge – drums, percussion, vocals  
Track 17:
Justin Hayward – guitar, vocals
John Lodge – bass, guitar, vocals
Graeme Edge – drums, percussion, vocals

References

Moody Blues
The Moody Blues compilation albums
2005 greatest hits albums